Ankur (English: The Seedling) is an Indian colour film of 1974. It was the first feature film directed by Shyam Benegal and the debut of Indian actors Anant Nag and Shabana Azmi. Anant Nag was introduced in Ankur by Shyam Benegal after his higher education in Mumbai. The film was shot in Hyderabad. Though Shabana Azmi had acted in other films as well, Ankur was her first release.

Like many others of Benegal's films, Ankur belongs to the genre of Indian art films, or more precisely, Indian Parallel Cinema. The plot is based on a true story that occurred in Hyderabad, apparently in the 1950s. It was filmed almost entirely on location.

Ankur has won three National Film Awards and 43 other prizes, both in India and abroad. It was nominated for the Golden Bear at the 24th Berlin International Film Festival.

This film includes one whipping scene and more profanity than is usually found in Indian films.

Plot
Ankur is a complex film that analyzes human behaviour in general and heavily stresses characterisation (though the story is not fictional). The story revolves around two characters, Lakshmi and Surya.

Lakshmi (Shabana Azmi) lives in a village with her husband Kishtayya (Sadhu Meher), a deaf-mute alcoholic potter who communicates using gestures. The couple is poor and belongs to the lowly Dalit caste. Lakshmi attends a village festival and prays faithfully to the Goddess, stating that her only desire in life is to have a child.

Surya (Anant Nag), the son of the village landlord, had just finished his studies in the nearby city of Hyderabad and arrives back home. Surya's father (Khader Ali Beg) has a mistress named Kaushalya with whom he has an illegitimate son named Pratap. Surya's father claims to have given Kaushalya "the best land in the village", a gift which serves as both a token of his affection and also keeps Kaushalya quiet and satisfied. Surya is forced by his father into a child marriage with the under aged Saru (Priya Tendulkar), and begins to feel extremely sexually frustrated due to the fact that they cannot have sex until Saru reaches puberty.

Surya reluctantly takes over the administrative responsibilities of his share of land in the village. Alone, he moves into a different, older house, and Lakshmi and Kishtayya are sent as his servants. Not long after his arrival, he begins to exert his authority by introducing a number of different laws and measures, many of which are controversial among the village people. Almost immediately, Surya starts to form an attraction towards Lakshmi, and gives her the task of cooking his meals and serving him tea. This does not sit well with the village priest, a man who traditionally delivers food to the landowner, though at a higher price than Lakshmi asks.

Surya also hires Kishtayya to ride his bullock cart and run his errands. The following day, he has Kishtayya collect fertilizer from the landlord's house. Surya then uses Kishtayya's absence to flirt with Lakshmi, but she fails to reciprocate. In the meantime, the villagers have begun to gossip, and many (most notably the overseer, Police Officer Patel Sheikh Chand) believe that Surya has already slept with Lakshmi, and will act in the same way that his father did - try to conceal the scandal by giving his mistress a vast plot of land.

Kishtayya is caught stealing toddy, after which he is publicly humiliated, and he decides to leave the village due to the embarrassment. In his absence, Surya and Lakshmi sleep together. Some time later, Saru arrives at the village, in order to live with her husband. Saru does not approve of Lakshmi's presence, partly because Lakshmi is a Dalit and partly because Saru has heard the villagers' rumours. The next morning, Lakshmi has morning sickness, and Saru fires her, claiming that she is too sick to work.

Many days go by, and eventually Kishtayya returns, having cured himself of his alcoholism and made some money. Lakshmi is overwhelmed with a feeling of guilt, because she believes that she has betrayed her husband. On discovering Lakshmi's pregnancy, he salutes the village goddess at her temple, acknowledging that his wife's wish has been granted. He then decides to return to work and hopefully ride the bullock cart once again for Surya. Surya sees Kishtayya and mistakenly believes that Kishtayya is seeking revenge from him due to his infidelity with Lakshmi.

Surya orders three men to grab hold of Kishtayya and then proceeds to whip him with a rope used for lynching. The commotion attracts others, including Sheikh Chand and Pratap, to the scene, and Lakshmi rushes to defend her husband. She angrily curses Surya, then slowly returns home with Kishtayya. In the final scene, after the others have left, a young child throws a stone at Surya's glass window and runs away.

Characters
The plot is portrayed through the perspectives of Surya and Lakshmi. However, several other major characters and relatively minor characters also enhance the plot, each in his own way.

Surya
During his wedding, Surya glances first at Kaushalya and Pratap (who are sitting together), then at his own mother. Kaushalya is smiling because her son's wedding is to be held with Surya's, but Surya's mother appears relatively resigned. This is how he always saw marriage: the legitimate wife who suffers and the mistress who prospers.

Formerly an inhabitant of the city, he is not accustomed to the ways of the village. When Sheikh Chand expresses his hopes that the village will improve with Surya's presence, Surya's only reply is: "Yeah, well, they better." It is for this reason that Surya begins making changes as he deems fit.

In addition, Surya's father gives Pratap the "best" land in the village while Surya lives in an old house. As a result, Surya's second change in the village is to stop water from flowing into Pratap's and Kaushalya's fields. Kaushalya requests a reason from Surya, who points out that he is not her son. She responds, "I think of you that way" - a remark that makes Surya even more angry.

At least two days later, Pratap asks Surya to restore the water flow into his fields. When Surya refuses, Pratap threatens to report Surya's actions to their father. Surya initially dismisses this warning but is surprised when his father eventually does show up. Surya tries to defend his actions but is unsuccessful in doing so.

Before his father arrived (but after Pratap's visit), Surya had promised to take care of Lakshmi "forever." However, when he finds out that she is pregnant, he coaxes her to abort the child and refuses to take responsibility over the baby. She refuses to have an abortion because she always wanted a child, so Surya tells her to leave.

When Saru announces to Surya that she has caught Lakshmi stealing rice, he warns Lakshmi that he would have whipped her until she began bleeding if she were not a woman. Then he forbids her to come near his house again. Sheikh Chand requests Surya to consider Lakshmi's situation more thoroughly. Surya refuses while nervously wiping his hands.

Lakshmi
Lakshmi readily serves Surya as a servant, albeit at a low wage. That is what she is expected to do. However, the villagers did not realize that Surya would find her attractive and ask her to do additional chores.

She often appears to be worried: first about Kishtayya's alcoholism, then about where he has gone and how to live without him, and finally, about her loyalty to him.

It is clear that Lakshmi had an extended affair with Surya which seems to have started when she places her head on Surya's shoulder and the scene ends abruptly. After that there are several occasions when we see her dressing up or her lying next to Surya in bed.

Rajamma
Two days after Kishtayya's departure, Lakshmi witnesses (from a distance) two men dragging a village woman to the panchayat. The woman, Rajamma, refuses to go while the men accuse her of "dishonouring our brother." At the panchayat, the men reveal that she has committed adultery.

Her brothers-in-law argue that they have "two wells" and "two crops a year," maintaining that Rajamma could not want more. Rajamma explains that she wants a child (Lakshmi immediately realizes the similarity to her own desires). "My not having a child," she claims, "is because of him, my husband." She threatens suicide if she is forced to live with her husband, Yadgiri. When asked what his argument is, Yadgiri simply allows the judges to make a decision.

Before Rajamma expresses her views, the judges reprimand her for disgracing "your house, your family, and your village" by living with another man. At this point, Surya looks at Lakshmi, who already lives with him. The final verdict is that Rajamma must live with her husband and that Yadgiri's brothers should compensate if she is dissatisfied. After the trial, Rajamma commits suicide.

Lakshmi can identify closely with Rajamma. After Rajamma's suicide, she tells Surya that she wishes to return to Kishtayya. However, she realizes that this is impossible, and Surya promises to look after her.

Saru
As soon as Saru arrives, she bows before Surya, and Lakshmi garlands her. She immediately begins adding decorations to the house, namely a frame with the message "Good Luck" (in English) and a picture from her wedding. She also puts a garland around a framed picture of two Hindu deities, and prays to them. She knows about Surya's affair with Lakshmi, but she is puzzled when she sees Lakshmi cursing Surya since she does not know about Kishtayya.

Saru is rarely shown smiling until she sacks Lakshmi. In fact, the very first day, just as Surya is hanging up the wedding picture and Lakshmi is walking into her room, she points out Lakshmi's presence by silently staring at him and nodding slightly towards Lakshmi's room. When Surya tries to avoid discussion of the affair by criticizing how he looks in the picture, Saru does not speak to him and does not even allow him to touch her. That same night, she suggests that he sack Lakshmi; an unconcerned Surya tells her to do as she wishes.

Saru is a supporter of the caste system. When Lakshmi makes tea for the new couple, Surya accepts his glass. Saru, on the other hand, refuses hers before expressing her surprise at Surya (not realizing that he was the one who had Lakshmi make tea in the first place). She then refuses to have "anything she [Lakshmi] has touched."

Surya's father
If not for Surya's father, Surya would have been far less likely to meet Lakshmi, change the village's rhythm of life, and cause a revolt. However, he insists that Surya control his share of land. He does not believe in hiring others to administer the land for him because he thinks they will "get rich at our cost" and seize the land for themselves.

Kaushalya
Though she always smiles when speaking to Surya, Kaushalya does not like him very much. In his absence, she calls him a "spoiled brat" and a "mere boy." She always calls him her "son", as if his legitimate wife was nonexistent. She has become rich at Surya's mother's cost. Many, if not all, of these facts provoke Surya to try to put an end to her progress by cutting off the water supply.

Pratap
Pratap does not seem to consider Surya's feelings about Kaushalya very thoroughly. He also does not hesitate to enter his half-brother's house without permission. However, he is perhaps more enraged than any of the other villagers when he observes the injured Kishtayya at the end of the film. In that scene, he appears to stay and stare at Surya's window longer than any of the other villagers.

Sheikh Chand
Sheikh Chand (played by Agha Mohammed Hussain) is the Muslim overseer of the landlord's property. When Surya arrives in the village, he is initially hopeful that the new arrival might improve the village. These hopes seem to disappear within a day: Surya monopolizes the toddy trade and demands that Sheikh Chand guard the toddy. Sheikh Chand promises to punish anyone who steals the toddy severely, but once Surya leaves, the expression on his face changes from a smile to a straight face.

Kishtayya
Kishtayya is strong both physically and mentally. It is because of Kishtayya's physical strength that Surya is afraid of him, and his mental strength is demonstrated by his ability to overcome alcoholism (facilities for alcoholics were generally not available in India during the 1950s, particularly not in villages). Surya, however, exploits Kishtayya's weaknesses (i.e. the fact that Kishtayya is deaf-mute, alcoholic, poor, and a Dalit). Kishtayya's alcoholism allows Surya to humiliate him so that Surya can be closer to Lakshmi. Kishtayya's physical handicap prevents him from understanding what is happening when Surya proceeds to beat him in the end, and his poverty and caste do not permit him to complain about Surya's actions.

In spite of his weaknesses, Kishtayya uses his job as a cart-driver to drive willing schoolchildren to their homes at the end of the day.

The Boy
One of the characters is an anonymous boy who first appears in the scene in which Kishtayya steals toddy. The boy is the one who reports the theft to Surya; from that day until the end of the film, they seem to be on friendly terms (just before Kishtayya is beaten, the boy is shown flying kites with Surya). However, at the end of the film, he suddenly turns against Surya by breaking his window.

Motif of the seedling
In addition to being the title of the film, the seedling makes various appearances (both physically and metaphorically) in the film and is used as a motif.
 In the first scene, a village woman appears to offer the seedling of a fruit to the goddess while Lakshmi prays for a child. (As she offers the seedling, it seems that the first word she utters is pandlu which means "fruits" in Telugu.)
 The seedling may also represent the child that Lakshmi desires.
 Not long before Kishtayya is caught stealing toddy, there is a scene in which Lakshmi is cooking dinner. Suddenly, near the doorstep, she notices a pot containing a seedling. The implication is that Kishtayya has gone out to drink again and has left Lakshmi the seedling as compensation. She steps outside the doorstep, finds Kishtayya staggering home, and breaks the pot in front of him before returning inside.
 Metaphorically speaking, the seedling of popular rebellion sprouts at the end of the film (the villagers begin to protest the village's social hierarchy)

Social issues
Many reviewers suggest that Ankur makes a statement concerning one particular social issue. In reality, it addresses several, including (but not necessarily limited to) those listed below:
 Alcoholism: Kishtayya used to be a "good potter," Lakshmi tells Surya. However, demand for his clay pots decreased as aluminium vessels were becoming increasingly popular. As he could not sell many pots, he began to drown his sorrows in alcohol. Lakshmi claims that Kishtayya is a "good man" whose "only fault is drinking." Two scenes show Kishtayya returning home after a night of drinking while Lakshmi cooks dinner. In both scenes, a worried Lakshmi scolds her husband, trying to discourage him from drinking. Kishtayya's only response is to go to bed on a hungry stomach. He does not overcome his alcoholism until he abandons Lakshmi.
 Casteism: The film provides a deeper insight into the ugliness of Indian caste system, particularly visible in the rural areas. The villagers expect Lakshmi to work as Surya's servant. However, being a Dalit, tradition forbids that she cook meals for Surya. Thus, when Surya asks Lakshmi to cook his meals, the villagers (particularly the Hindu greengrocer) begin to disapprove of him. When Saru moves to Surya's house, she refuses to touch "anything that she (Lakshmi) has touched."
 Rich vs. poor: The first time Lakshmi is shown scolding Kishtayya, she claims that she is obliged to commit petty theft in order to care for herself and her husband. She initially steals no more than three handfuls a day of rice from Surya. Some time after she is dismissed from her job, she returns to Surya's house to look for work again. Saru offers Lakshmi food instead of work, and Lakshmi attempts to steal a little more rice than usual (as she is pregnant). Saru catches her red-handed as she brings a meal, then forces her to put back the rice, saying, "You people starve because you steal." In the end, Lakshmi refuses "your [Surya's] jobs, your money, anything of yours!" thus suggesting that poverty does not concern her in this context.
 Parent vs. child: The relationship between Surya and his father appears to be rather unsteady; neither of them smiles when they are together. Surya tries to spend more time with his friends by asking his father for permission to study for a Bachelor of Arts degree. However, his father (who already knows what Surya is trying to do) refuses him permission and forces him to marry Saru. Little does Surya's father initially know what the consequences of these actions of his will be.
 Sexual drive: Surya, Lakshmi, and Rajamma have all engaged in adultery. Each has his own reasons. Surya is sexually frustrated, and Rajamma wants a child. Lakshmi's reasons are unclear, for Ankur does not reveal when her affair with Surya began. (See the Unanswered Questions section of this article.)
 Changing loyalties: Saru is perhaps the only character who does not change her loyalty to something (in her case, tradition). Surya pretends to be loyal to Lakshmi but abandons her once she becomes pregnant. Lakshmi is loyal to her husband until she sleeps with Surya. We do not know whether Kishtayya has remained loyal to his wife in his absence (though it seems improbable considering his general respect for Lakshmi, adultery on his part might explain why he forgives her). Certainly, he has abandoned his loyalty to alcohol but remains supportive of his wife.
 Religious differences: This less predominant issue characterizes the relationship between two of the minor characters, namely Sheikh Chand and the greengrocer. Their religious differences encourages them to play nonviolent practical jokes on one another. The greengrocer tricks Sheikh Chand into getting Surya's car out of the mud; later, Sheikh Chand reciprocates by stealing a few betel leaves from the greengrocer.
 Dowry: This issue is a relatively minor one in the film. It is addressed only in one quote, when Lakshmi explains why she married Kishtayya. After Surya asks why Lakshmi chose to marry a "drunken deaf-mute," she answers that no one else would marry her as she could not afford to pay dowry. She then points out that Kishtayya was not yet a drunkard.

Production
The characters in Ankur often speak the Dakhani language, a variant of Standard Hindi-Urdu spoken in Southern India (particularly in the Hyderabad area). For example, when Surya asks Lakshmi where Kishtayya is, she responds, "Mereku naheeN maaluum" in Dakhani instead of "Mujhe naheeN maaluum" (I don't know) in Standard Hindi. (See Muslim culture of Hyderabad for more examples of Dakhani.)

Shabana Azmi, a fresh graduate from Film and Television Institute of India, Pune (FTII), wasn't the first choice for the role of Lakshmi. Benegal had earlier approached Waheeda Rehman, Anju Mahendru and Sharada, all of whom had refused his offer. Thereafter, he chose Shabana Azmi; he had to alter the script a bit to suit the younger-looking Lakshmi.

Benegal was initially reluctant to hire Azmi, thinking she was a model and perhaps unsuitable for the role of a humble villager.

Music
Being an Indian art film, Ankur is a "straight" feature without musical sequences. However, Surya plays parts of two records over the course of the film. The first recording consists of the third stanza of the song "Yahi To Hai Woh" by Mohd. Rafi from Solvan Saal (1958). The fourth stanza is then played in the background while Surya talks to Lakshmi.

The film also includes several scenes in which villagers sing folk songs, mostly in Telugu.

Cast
 Anant Nag as Surya
 Mirza Qadir Ali Baig as Surya's father
 Prafullata Natu as Surya's mother
 Priya Tendulkar as Saru
 Shabana Azmi as Lakshmi
 Sadhu Meher as Kishtaya
 Dalip Tahil
 Agha Mohammed Hussain as Sheik Chand

Reception
The film was both a commercial and critical success. The film's producer, Lalit M. Bijlani, who produced the film for just five lakhs rupees, went on to make one crore with its release. On the review aggregator website Rotten Tomatoes, the film holds a rating of 100% based on 6 reviews.

The Independent noted "the deeply impressive lead performance by Shabana Azmi demonstrates Ankur as one of the most mature and compelling films the Indian cinema has to offer". For the Time Out reviewer, the film "recalled the modest realism of Satyajit Ray". A recent reviewer said, "Shyam Benegal creates a sublime and provocative examination of hypocrisy, economic disparity, and the social status of women in Ankur.

Awards
 1975 National Film Award for Second Best Feature Film: Shyam Benegal
 1975 National Film Award for Best Actor: Sadhu Meher
 1975 National Film Award for Best Actress: Shabana Azmi
 1974: Berlin International Film Festival: Golden Berlin Bear: nominated

See also
 Shyam Benegal
 Muslim culture of Hyderabad (for more examples of Dakhani)

References

External links
 
 
 Resource page on Ankur
 Excerpts of Ankur

1974 films
1974 drama films
1974 directorial debut films
Indian drama films
Indian films based on actual events
Films featuring a Best Actress National Award-winning performance
Films directed by Shyam Benegal
Films featuring a Best Actor National Award-winning performance
Indian feudalism
Films set in Telangana
Films about the caste system in India
Films about women in India
Films shot in Hyderabad, India
Second Best Feature Film National Film Award winners